Statistics of Swiss Super League in the 1935–36 season.

Overview
It was contested by 14 teams, and Lausanne Sports won the championship.

League standings

Results

Sources 
 Switzerland 1935-36 at RSSSF

Nationalliga seasons
Swiss
1935–36 in Swiss football